Ivor John Skinner (born 1 April 1928) is a former English cricketer.  Skinner was a right-handed batsman who bowled right-arm fast-medium.  He was born at Walthamstow, Essex.

Skinner made his first-class debut for Essex against Glamorgan in the 1950 County Championship.  He made twelve further first-class appearances in that season, the last of which came against Kent.  In his twelve first-class appearances, he took 21 wickets at an average of 38.47, with best figures of 4/56.  A tailend batsman in the truest sense of the word, Skinner scored just 28 runs at a batting average of 2.00, with a high score of 7 not out.  This was his only season of first-class cricket with Essex, with him leaving the county at the end of it.

He later played for Cornwall in the Minor Counties Championship, making his debut for the county against the Somerset Second XI in 1956.  He played Minor counties cricket for Cornwall from 1956 to 1959, making ten appearances.

References

External links
Ivor Skinner at ESPNcricinfo
Ivor Skinner at CricketArchive

1928 births
Living people
People from Walthamstow
English cricketers
Essex cricketers
Cornwall cricketers